Ljubomir Ristić (Cyrillic: Љубомир Ристић, born May 1, 1990) is a Serbian professional basketball player.

He last played for Železničar from Inđija.

References

1990 births
Living people
Basketball League of Serbia players
Serbian men's basketball players
Serbian expatriate basketball people in Montenegro
Small forwards
Shooting guards